Karen Brown may refer to:

Karen Brown (ballerina) (born 1955), American ballerina and artistic director
Karen Brown (cricketer) (born 1963), Australian cricketer
 Karen Brown (field hockey) (born 1963), British hockey player
 Karen McCarthy Brown (1942–2015), American anthropologist
 Karen Brown (author), American short story writer, see O. Henry Award
 Karen Brown, Republican candidate in the 2011 Philadelphia mayoral election